Bagshot is a rural locality in the City of Greater Bendigo, in the state of Victoria. The locality has a public hall built in 1909.

References

Towns in Victoria (Australia)
Suburbs of Bendigo
Bendigo